The 1977–78 Southern Football League season was the 75th in the history of the league, an English football competition.

Bath City won the championship, winning their second Southern League title, whilst Witney Town, Margate, Bridgend Town and Dorchester Town were all promoted to the Premier Division, the former two as champions. Romford folded at the end of the season.

Premier Division
The Premier Division consisted of 22 clubs, including 18 clubs from the previous season and four new clubs:
Two clubs promoted from Division One North:
Cheltenham Town
Worcester City

Two clubs promoted from Division One South:
Barnet
Hastings United

League table

Division One North
Division One North consisted of 20 clubs, including 18 clubs from the previous season and two new clubs:
Bridgend Town, joined from the Welsh Football League
Burton Albion, relegated from the Premier Division

League table

Division One South
Division One South expanded up to 20 clubs, including 15 clubs from the previous season and five new clubs:
Two clubs, relegated from the Premier Division
Chelmsford City
Margate

Two clubs joined from the Athenian League
Addlestone
Hounslow

Plus:
Taunton Town, joined from the Western League

League table

Football League elections
At the end of the season, the bottom four of the Football League had to be re-elected to retain their place, with one club from each of the Southern League and Northern Premier League also on the ballot. Champions Bath City participated in the vote, but finished bottom. NPL club Wigan Athletic were elected to the League after beating Southport in a second round of voting.

See also
 Southern Football League
 1977–78 Northern Premier League

References

Southern Football League seasons
S